Barker House was once a hotel in Manitou Springs, Colorado in the Manitou Springs Historic District. It is a National Register of Historic Places listing.

History
Charles Barker bought Pine Cottage in 1881 and built an extension and expanded it to the "Barker House". Barker was previously a manager and Manitou House schoolteacher. The Barker House is now a private, residential building, with 48 units.

Notes

References

Further reading
 

Colorado State Register of Historic Properties
Hotel buildings on the National Register of Historic Places in Colorado
Manitou Springs, Colorado
National Register of Historic Places in El Paso County, Colorado